Callipia is a genus of moths in the family Geometridae, first described by Achille Guenée in 1858.

Species 
Callipia contains the following species:
 Callipia anthocharidaria (Oberthür, 1881)
 Callipia augustae Brehm, 2018
 Callipia aurata Warren, 1904
 Callipia balteata Warren, 1905
 Callipia brenemanae Sperry, 1951
 Callipia constantinaria Oberthür, 1881
 Callipia fiedleri Brehm, 2018
 Callipia flagrans Warren, 1904
 Callipia fulvida Warren, 1907
 Callipia hausmanni Brehm, 2018
 Callipia hiltae Brehm, 2018
 Callipia intermedia Dognin, 1914
 Callipia jakobi Brehm, 2018
 Callipia jonai Brehm, 2018
 Callipia karsholti Brehm, 2018
 Callipia lamasi Brehm, 2018
 Callipia languescens Warren, 1904
 Callipia levequei Brehm, 2018
 Callipia milleri Brehm, 2018
 Callipia occulta Warren, 1904
 Callipia occulta Warren, 1904
 Callipia paradisea Thierry-Mieg, 1904
 Callipia parrhasiata Guenée, 1858
 Callipia rosetta Thierry-Mieg, 1904
 Callipia rougeriei Brehm, 2018
 Callipia sihvoneni Brehm, 2018
 Callipia vicinaria Dognin, 1913
 Callipia walterfriedlii Brehm, 2018
 Callipia wojtusiaki Brehm, 2018

References

Larentiinae